Matzliah (lit. Successful) is a moshav in central Israel. Located in the Shfela around two kilometres south of Ramla, it falls under the jurisdiction of Gezer Regional Council.

History
The moshav was founded in 1950 by Karaite Jews from Egypt, and was named after Sahl ben Matzliah, a Karaite philosopher and writer.

References

1949 establishments in Israel
Egyptian-Jewish culture in Israel
Karaite Judaism
Moshavim
Populated places established in 1950
Populated places in Central District (Israel)